Shooting Rubberbands at the Stars is the debut studio album by American alternative rock band Edie Brickell & New Bohemians, released on August 9, 1988 by Geffen Records. The album went 2× platinum in the United States.

"What I Am" was the lead single and big hit from the album, reaching #7 on the Billboard Hot 100. The follow-up single, "Circle," was about strained relationships. Although described by author Brent Mann as "the perfect follow up single to 'What I Am'" and which "had 'smash' written all over it," it stalled at #48 on the Billboard Hot 100 and fared slightly better on the Billboard Mainstream Rock chart, reaching #32.  Cash Box said of "Circle" that "The key to this gentle song is Brickell’s breathy intensity. Supported by an acoustic-slanted track, she manages to sell the unusually dark lyric shadings."  Another song from the album, "Little Miss S." was inspired by Edie Sedgwick and reached #38 on the Mainstream Rock chart and #14 on the Modern Rock Tracks chart.

Track listing

Song notes
Excerpted from a "songbook" included with a box set of the "What I Am" single, presumed to be annotated and illustrated by Brickell herself:

What I Am "What I Am is a smart-alec's way out of a deep discussion on the universe as it relates to the self."

Little Miss S. "Little Miss S. is just another one of those famous dead people."

Air of December "People change & affect you just like the weather."

The Wheel "Your kind's always gonna be a-round."

Love Like We Do "We're broke & we're ugly."

Circle "That weird lost feeling can get you even when you're hangin' round with friends."

Beat the Time "Time Divides."

She "She's just about a homegirl."

Nothing "There's something about nothing – but it's nothing I wanna talk about."

Now "When your heart occupies your head."

Keep Coming Back "Some people get right on your mind & just stay there."

I Do "I Do is a song for my cat."

Personnel 
The New Bohemians
 Edie Brickell – vocals
 Kenny Withrow – guitars
 Brad Houser – bass
 Brandon Aly – drums
 John Bush – percussion

with
 Paul "Wix" Wickens – keyboards
 Robbie Blunt – guitars
 Chris Whitten – drums
 John Henry – backing vocals

Both Chris Whitten and Paul "Wix" Wickens were/are members of Paul McCartney's band;  Whitten from 1989 to 1990 and Wickens from 1989-present.

Production 
 Pat Moran – producer, engineer 
 George Marino – mastering at Sterling Sound (New York City, New York)
 Barry Diament – CD mastering at Barry Diament Mastering (New York City, New York)
 Gabrielle Raumberger – art coordinator 
 Terry Robertson – CD design 
 Edie Brickell – cover illustration
 Mark Abrahams – solo photography 
 Bob Cook – band photography 

 Tracks 6 & 8 published by Geffen Music-Withrow Publishing-Edie Brickell Songs.
 Tracks 11 & 12 published by Geffen Music-Edie Brickell Songs.
 All other tracks published by Geffen Music-Strangemind Productions-Enlightened Kitty-Withrow Publishing-Edie Brickell Songs.

Reception
"Shooting Rubberbands at the Stars is almost impossible to be cynical about (I tried)," remarked Time Out, "and the band are so likeable it's almost unreal."

Charts

Weekly charts

Year-end charts

Certifications

References

Edie Brickell & New Bohemians albums
1988 debut albums
Geffen Records albums
Albums produced by Pat Moran
Albums recorded at Rockfield Studios